League Park is a former baseball ground located in Toledo, Ohio, US. The ground was home to the Toledo Blue Stockings baseball club of the then-major American Association from May 14, 1884, to September 23, 1884. The club also played minor league games here in 1883 and 1885.

The ballpark was located on a block bounded by Monroe Street (southwest), 15th Street (northwest), Jefferson Avenue (northeast), and 13th Street (southeast), a few blocks northwest of the site of the current Fifth Third Field.

This was the home field in 1884 for Moses Fleetwood Walker, the best-known of the black American major league ballplayers in the 19th Century prior to the color line being drawn.

See also
 List of baseball parks in Toledo, Ohio

Sources
The Toledo Baseball Guide of the Mud Hens 1883-1943, Ralph Elliott Lin Weber, 1944.
Ballparks of North America, Michael Benson, McFarland, 1989.

External links

Defunct baseball venues in the United States
Sports venues in Toledo, Ohio
Baseball venues in Ohio
Demolished sports venues in Ohio
Defunct sports venues in Ohio